Lejonströmsbron is a wooden bridge in Skellefteå, Sweden, crossing Skellefte River between the boroughs Sunnanå and Prästbordet, near the parish church for Skellefteå landsförsamling. The bridge was completed in 1737 and is the oldest wooden bridge in Sweden.

During its first years of operation, the toll to cross the bridge was:
A walking person - 1 öre
A rider on horseback - 3 öre
Carts pulled by a horse - 6 öre
Wagon pulled by several horses - 12 öre

In 1868 a speed limit was introduced over the bridge. If a person drove or rode faster than a pedestrian, they could be fined five riksdaler.

Lejonströmsbron was declared a listed building in Sweden in 1994.

The last war battles that took place on Swedish soil, took place in north Sweden under the Finnish War, also known as the 1808–09 war. On May 15, 1809 the Battle of Lejonströmsbron occurred.



Gallery

See also
 List of bridges

References

External links
 

Bridges completed in 1737
Bridges in Sweden
Former toll bridges in Sweden
1737 establishments in Sweden